The slender-billed babbler (Argya longirostris) is a species of bird in the family Leiothrichidae.
It is found in Bangladesh, Nepal, Northeast India and possibly Myanmar.
Its natural habitat is subtropical or tropical seasonally wet or flooded lowland grassland.
It is threatened by habitat loss.

This species was formerly placed in the genus Turdoides but following the publication of a comprehensive molecular phylogenetic study in 2018, it was moved to the resurrected genus Argya.

References

Collar, N. J. & Robson, C. 2007. Family Timaliidae (Babblers)  pp. 70 – 291 in; del Hoyo, J., Elliott, A. & Christie, D.A. eds. Handbook of the Birds of the World, Vol. 12. Picathartes to Tits and Chickadees. Lynx Edicions, Barcelona.

External links
BirdLife Species Factsheet.

slender-billed babbler
Birds of Nepal
Birds of Northeast India
slender-billed babbler
Taxonomy articles created by Polbot
Taxobox binomials not recognized by IUCN